Hyderabad District,  is a district of Sindh, Pakistan. Its capital is the city of Hyderabad. The district is the second most urbanized in Sindh, after Karachi, with 80% of its residents live in urban areas.

History
The East India Company occupied Sindh in 1843; They formed three districts in Sindh administratively: Hyderabad, Karachi and Shikarpur (now Sukkur district).

In 1982, the largest area of the district in eastern side bifurcated to create a new district Thar and Parkar district with the headquarters Umerkot.

In 1907, create a new taluka named Nasrat from Sakrand and Shahdadpur taluka.

In 1912, the northern side of the district separated to form Nawabshah district.

In 1975, Southern side also separated to form  Badin district.

After 1998 census, two new talukas created in the district named; Hyderabad city and Latifabad talukas.

After 2002 elections, a new taluka created in the district named Qasimabad from Hyderabad City taluka.

The city of Hyderabad is where the district headquarters were located and the district government used to be seated. The last Deputy Commissioner of the district was Rizwan Ahmed. Until the early 1970s the district included all the four districts mentioned above as well as the Badin district. This administrative setup was demolished by former President Pervez Musharraf in 2001 when he introduced the local body government.

In 2005, three new districts - Tando Muhammad Khan, Matiari and Tando Allahyar districts were formed out of Hyderabad district.

Geography
Hyderabad District is 104,877 hectares in size. 14,250 hectares of the district are under wheat cultivation, with a total annual production of over 55,000 tonnes.

Administration and government
The district Administration is given below:
 Hyderabad Tehsil (Rural Areas)
 Hyderabad city Tehsil
 Latifabad Tehsil
 Qasimabad Tehsil

Demographics 

At the time of the 2017 census, Hyderabad district had a population of 2,199,928, of which 1,145,216 were males and 1,054,407 females. The rural population was 373,410 (16.97%) and urban 1,826,518 (83.03%). The literacy rate is 65.76%: 69.91% for males and 61.23% for females.

Religion

The majority religion is Islam, with 90.86% of the population. Hinduism (including those from Scheduled Castes) is practiced by 8.22%, while Christianity is practiced by 0.86% of the population.

Language

At the time of the 2017 census, 43.44% of the population spoke Sindhi, 42.61% Urdu, 4.45% Punjabi, 3.22% Pashto and 1.22% Saraiki as their first language.

List of Dehs
The following is a list of Hyderabad District's dehs, organised by taluka:

 Hyderabad Taluka (70 dehs)
 Abri
 Agheemani
 Almani
 Alni
 Amilpur
 Barechani
 Barham
 Bhido Jagar
 Bhido Rayati
 Bhinpur
 Bilori
 Bohiki
 Boochki Jagir
 Boochki Rayati
 Buxo laghari
 Chacha Detha
 Chukhi
 Dachrapur
 Dali Nandi
 Dali Wadi
 Damanchani Rayati
 Dhamanchani Jagir
 Ghaliyoon
 Ghotana
 Gujjan
 Gul Mohd Thoro
 Halepota
 Hatri
 Hotki
 Hussain Khan Thoro
 Kajhur
 Kathri
 Kathro
 Khanpota
 Khunjejani
 Kunner
 Lashari
 Liyar Jagir
 Mati
 Miyano
 Moharo
 Moolan
 Mori Jagir
 Mori Rayati
 Mulki
 Narejani
 Noorai Jagir
 Noorai Rayati
 Panhwari
 Pasaikhi
 Patbhari
 Patoro
 Raees
 Rahooki
 Rajpari
 Rukanpur
 Sahita
 Sanhwar
 Seri Jagir
 Seri Rayati
 Sipki Jagir
 Sipki Rayati
 Sukhpur
 Takio Jeewan Shah Jagir
 Takio Jeewan Shah Rayati
 Tando Fazal
 Tando Qaiser
 Thaheem
 Theba
 Widh
 Qasimabad Taluka (4 dehs)
 Jamshoro
 Mirzapur
 Sari
 Shah Bukhari
 Latifabad Taluka (10 dehs)
 Bora reyati
 Ganjo Takar
 Giddu Bandar
 Goondar
 Khater
 Lakhi Keti
 Malh
 Mehrani
 Met Khan
 Nareja
 Hyderabad City Taluka (4 dehs)
 Foujgah
 Ghanghra
 Gujjo
 Hyderabad

See also
Hyderabad, Sindh
List of educational institutions in Hyderabad, Sindh
 Shiv temple, Hyderabad

Notes

References

Bibliography

 
Districts of Sindh